Belgium Township is a township in Polk County, Minnesota, United States. The population was 111 at the 2000 census. It is part of the Grand Forks-ND-MN Metropolitan Statistical Area.

Belgium Township was organized in 1880. A large share of the early settlers being natives of Belgium caused the name to be selected.

Geography

Demographics
As of the census of 2000, there were 111 people, 35 households, and 26 families residing in the township. The population density was 3.0 people per square mile (1.2/km2). There were 38 housing units at an average density of 1.0/sq mi (0.4/km2). The racial makeup of the township was 91.89% White and 8.11% Native American.

There were 35 households, out of which 42.9% had children under the age of 18 living with them, 71.4% were married couples living together, 2.9% had a female householder with no husband present, and 25.7% were non-families. 22.9% of all households were made up of individuals, and 11.4% had someone living alone who was 65 years of age or older. The average household size was 3.17 and the average family size was 3.88.

In the township the population was spread out, with 36.9% under the age of 18, 6.3% from 18 to 24, 32.4% from 25 to 44, 17.1% from 45 to 64, and 7.2% who were 65 years of age or older. The median age was 33 years. For every 100 females there were 105.6 males. For every 100 females age 18 and over, there were 100.0 males.

The median income for a household in the township was $38,750, and the median income for a family was $38,750. Males had a median income of $26,875 versus $13,500 for females. The per capita income for the township was $10,385. There were 21.4% of families and 21.5% of the population living below the poverty line, including 20.0% of under eighteens and none of those over 64.

References

Townships in Polk County, Minnesota
Townships in Minnesota
Belgian-American history
Belgian-American culture